Keystroke programming describes a specific way of programming by which each keystroke on a device or application is recorded in some way and then played back so that the recorded key-presses can be repeated multiple times. Keystroke programming is most commonly but not exclusively found in programmable calculators, but there are keystroke-programmable software applications, too, for example Vim (text editor)

Example: TI Calculators 

The Texas Instruments TI-58/TI-58C/TI-59 calculators were programmable, and program storage took the form of a sequence of codes which (mostly) corresponded to the position of keys on the calculator keypad. Here is a simplified diagram of the basic key layout:

Each key is assigned a two-digit code; for most (but not all) keys, the tens digit comes from the row number (as indicated down the left of the table) and the units digit comes from the column number (as indicated across the top of the table).

Now consider a very simple program, which adds 2 to the number being displayed, and then stops. The program is entered starting from program location 000, and looks like this:

To use this program, you would enter the number n to be operated on, press  to ensure the current program location was 000, then  to start execution. When the program stops (which should happen quite quickly for such a simple program), the display will be showing the number n + 2.

This last code was chosen to be more easily understandable by a human trying to read the program. There is no row 0, so the codes 00 .. 09 are used to represent the keys  .. .

Context-Dependent Interpretations 

These TI calculators allowed for addressing up to 100 data memory locations, numbered 00 to 99 (some models had a lower limit than this). A keystroke sequence like    (store the currently-displayed number into memory 42) would be encoded as 42 42. In this case the first 42 is the key code for the  key, but the second 42 is not a key code, but a memory register number. The calculator knows to interpret it as such because that's what has to follow the code for the  key.

Program addresses were 3 digits, potentially allowing programs to consist of up to 1000 steps, numbered 000 to 999 (though in fact none of the models produced allowed for this maximum). A branch instruction, for example     (unconditional branch to location 345) would be encoded as 61 03 45. In this case the hundreds digit of the branch destination is in the units digit of the second instruction byte (after the opcode), with a zero tens digit; and the remaining digits are in the third instruction byte.

A code sequence like 61 11, on the other hand, represents the keystrokes  , which is a branch to the location marked by the symbolic label . The calculator can tell this is a symbolic branch, rather than a branch to a numbered location, because the tens digit of the byte immediately following the opcode is not zero.

Most of the keys on the keypad can be used as symbolic labels.

Modifier Keys 

Most of the keys had multiple functions, depending on whether  or  had been pressed beforehand.  invoked the "inverse" (whatever that meant) of the following function, and was recorded in a program as a separate keystroke (code 22), while  invoked a completely different function which was written on the keypad faceplate just above the key. For example, pressing   invoked the  function, while    (or  ) gave you the arcsine.

The code for this alternate function is derived from that of the original key function by adding 5 to the units digit (without carry to the tens digit). Thus, the key codes corresponding to the position of the  key itself (21 and 26) are never used as opcodes. Here is the table of the codes produced with the  prefix:

Merged Keystrokes 

The  key allows for indirection: wherever a reference to a memory register or a program location is allowed, this key can be used to fetch the actual value from a memory register. For example, the key sequence     means to fetch the value in memory register 10, and use that value in turn as the number of a memory register whose contents are to be fetched as the current operand.

But, because of the use of the 00 .. 09 codes for the  ..  keys, the codes 62-64, 72-74, 82-84 and 92 are available for other uses. So most of these are reallocated to represent op  sequences:

Thus, the key sequence     would be encoded as 73 10.

See also 
FOCAL keystroke programming
Macro recorder
Programming by demonstration

References 

Programmable calculators